The 2021 European Figure Skating Championships were scheduled to be held from 25 to 31 January 2021 in Zagreb, Croatia. Medals would have been awarded in the disciplines of men's singles, ladies' singles, pairs, and ice dance.

Zagreb was announced as the host in June 2018. The city previously hosted the competition in 1974, 1979, 2008, and 2013.

The competition was cancelled by the International Skating Union on 10 December 2020, due to the impact of the COVID-19 pandemic. This was the first time since World War II that the European Championships were not held.

Impact of the COVID-19 pandemic 
The competition venue, Arena Zagreb, began housing COVID-19 patients in November 2020 after the COVID-19 pandemic in Croatia worsened. Although the ISU considered postponing and/or relocating the event, the competition was ultimately cancelled on 10 December due to the pandemic. It was the third ISU Championship event of the season to be cancelled, following the 2021 Four Continents and 2021 World Junior Championships.

On 11 December, Figure Skating Federation of Russia (FFKKR) president Alexander Gorshkov announced FFKKR's intention to organize and hold an alternative event to the European Championships.

Qualification

Age and minimum TES requirements 
The competition was to be open to skaters from all European member nations of the International Skating Union. The corresponding competition for non-European skaters was scheduled to be the 2021 Four Continents Championships, before it was cancelled in October 2020.

Skaters would have been eligible for the 2021 European Championships if they turned 15 years of age before 1 July 2020 and met the minimum technical elements score requirements. The ISU accepts scores if they were obtained at senior-level ISU-recognized international competitions at least 21 days before the first official practice day of the championships.

Number of entries per discipline 
Based on the results of the 2020 European Championships, each qualifying ISU member nation can field one to three entries per discipline.

Schedule

Entries 
Member nations began announcing their selections in December 2020. The event was cancelled on 10 December.

References

External links 
 2021 European Championships at the International Skating Union
 Official website

European Figure Skating Championships
European Figure Skating Championships
International figure skating competitions hosted by Croatia
European Figure
European Figure Skating Championships
Sports competitions in Zagreb
European Figure Skating Championships